TiLite is a company that produces customized wheelchairs made from titanium and aluminum materials. The company is known for creating personalized wheelchairs through a process called TiFit, which involves tailoring each wheelchair to the exact specifications of its user.

History
TiLite has a history of designing and manufacturing wheelchairs, with one of its earliest models being the "CrossSport." Over time, the company has expanded its range of offerings to include a full lineup of titanium and aluminum wheelchairs.

As a division of TiSport, LLC, TiLite's headquarters are located in Pasco, Washington. In 2014, the company was acquired by Permobil, a Swedish company that specializes in power wheelchairs and seating systems.

Technology
TiLite uses Titanium for the frames of several lines of its high-performance wheelchairs.  Titanium has unique properties, but because Titanium is difficult to refine and requires expertise and precision in welding and bending, it is a more costly material. TiLite makes wheelchairs in both Titanium and Aluminum. While the company's Titanium chairs are slightly lighter in weight and more durable, their Aluminum wheelchairs are more economical and sufficient for most users.
The design and manufacturing process uses parametric modelling, computer aided design, and finite element analysis technologies to optimize design and material choices.

References

Additional sources
“TiLite Makes Marketing, Product & Brand Management Moves” Mobility Management, 8 March 2013.
TiLite Wheelchairs on Made in America – Full Episode (TiLite official YouTube channel)

External links

Easycare.ph

Wheelchair manufacturers
Pasco, Washington
Manufacturing companies based in Washington (state)
Sports equipment